Jeff Vintar is an American screenwriter who worked on I, Robot, and The Hot Zone, as well as Long Hello and Short Goodbye and Final Fantasy: The Spirits Within.

Filmography

Film
 Spaceless (2023).
 I, Robot (2004).
 Final Fantasy: The Spirits Within (released as "Fainaru Fantaji" in Japan) (2001).
 Long Hello and Short Goodbye (1999).

Television
 The Hot Zone (2019).

Projects in development

Syfy announced development of the Stephen King novel The Eyes of the Dragon as a movie or miniseries, where Michael Taylor and Jeff Vintar were reported as scriptwriters. At latest report (May 2019), Hulu was reported to be adapting the book as a television series, with no mention of use of the earlier Vintar script.

References

Further reading
   This work contains further descriptive content relevant to this Filmography entry.

External links

American male screenwriters
Living people
Year of birth missing (living people)